Cadbury Eclairs are a confectionery currently manufactured by Cadbury. Invented by the Birmingham-based confectionery company Taveners in 1932, they were adapted into a Dairy Milk version of Eclairs in 1965. They are available in bags or rolls and can be found in the Cadbury Heroes selection. Eclairs are currently available in the United Kingdom, Ireland, Australia, Kenya, Hong Kong, South Africa and India, where they are known as "Dairy Milk Eclairs". In 2013 Mondelēz International updated the UK ingredients list to add in the inclusion of palm oil in the recipe. In 2013 Cadbury rebranded its product to Choclairs in India.

Current products
Cadbury Eclairs: Cadbury milk chocolate encased in a chewy caramel. Launched 1965.
Cadbury Eclairs Orange Twist: Orange flavour Cadbury milk chocolate encased in a chewy caramel. Launched 2013.
Cadbury Eclairs Hazelnut Twist: Hazelnut flavour Cadbury milk chocolate encased in chewy caramel. Launched 2013.
Cadbury Eclairs Velvets: soft caramel with a chocolatey centre, encased in Cadbury milk chocolate. Launched 2014.
Cadbury Eclairs Velvets Coffee: soft coffee flavour caramel with a chocolate centre, covered in Cadbury milk chocolate. Launched in 2014, exclusive to Tesco.

See also

 List of chocolate bar brands

References 

British confectionery
Eclairs
Mondelez International brands
Brand name confectionery
Products introduced in 1965
Toffee
Candy